Gayatri Prasad Prajapati was an Indian politician. He was convicted of rape, criminal conspiracy, and criminal intimidation. He was a former cabinet minister in the government of Uttar Pradesh and served as Minister of Transport. He also served as a mining minister.

Early life 
Prajapati  was born in a poor Kumhar family from Amethi. He established Gayadai College there.

Allegations 
On a complaint filed by activist and advocate Nutan Thakur, Prajapati was under the Lokayukta scanner for corruption in illegal mining.  Later Nutan Thakur's husband ex IPS officer and Present, Adhikar Sena alleged that ex Uttar Pradesh Chief Minister Mulayam Singh Yadav threatened him for his wife's Lokayukta case against Prajapati.   Nutan Thakur also registered a criminal case against Prajapati for framing her and her husband in a false rape case, which is presently under trial before a Lucknow Court.  On 17 February 2017, the Supreme Court of India directed Uttar Pradesh police to lodge a complaint in connection with a rape case.

He was arrested in Lucknow on March 15, 2017 after an escape on February 27, 2017.

In 2016 Allahabad High Court charged him with allowing illegal mining in his capacity of mining minister in Shamli, Hamirpur, Fatehpur, Siddharthnagar, Deoria, Kaushambi and Saharanpur - in violation of rules and ban by the National Green Tribunal.

Rape 
A woman from Chitrakoot, alleged that Prajapati had raped her three years previously. Prajapati reportedly took photos and continued to rape her for two years by threatening to leak the photos. He also falsely promised to give her an important position in Party.

The victim later filed a complaint. However, the U.P. Police refused to file an FIR. The woman then approached Supreme Court, which directed the police to lodge a report. In February, 2017 he absconded, but was later arrested in Lucknow.

On 12 Nov. 2021, he was sentenced to life by MP MLA court Lucknow.

References

Samajwadi Party politicians
Living people
State cabinet ministers of Uttar Pradesh
Uttar Pradesh MLAs 2012–2017
Indian prisoners and detainees
Crime in Uttar Pradesh
Rape in India
Year of birth missing (living people)
People from Amethi
Samajwadi Party politicians from Uttar Pradesh